Nguyễn Huy Đẩu was born on May 8, 1914, in Vietnam.

Biography

In 1952, he graduated from Hanoi University School of Law degree and awarded a Doctorate Degree.

He has served as Ambassador to the Kingdom of Morocco and Counsel General in New Delhi, India.

In 1967, he served as Head Judge Superior Court in Saigon, until 1969, and then assigned as Inspector General, of Ministry of Foreign Affairs.

He was a Visiting Professor at Saigon University School of Law and Phu Tho Tech College.

In April 1975, he escaped during the Fall of Saigon because he was anti-communist and immigrated to the United States.

Since 1995, he has served as the  Minister of Justice of an exiled anti-communist organization known as The Government of Free Vietnam.

He died September 22, 2008.

External links
Featured Speaker Nguyen Huy Dau Audio
Government of Free Vietnam Official Site
Inauguration Ceremony of The Government of Free Vietnam (Photos)

American people of Vietnamese descent
Vietnamese people of the Vietnam War
Ambassadors of Vietnam to Morocco
Vietnamese exiles
1914 births
2008 deaths